Dale E. Stovall (born February 19, 1944) is a retired Brigadier General in the United States Air Force who figured prominently in several search and rescue operations during the Vietnam War. A member of the 40th Aerospace Rescue and Recovery Squadron based in Thailand, on June 2, 1972, he recovered Capt. Roger Locher from deep inside North Vietnam, the deepest rescue made during the entire Vietnam War. For his efforts in rescuing Locher, Stovall was awarded the Air Force Cross, which described how "he willingly returned to this high threat area, braving intense ground fire, to recover the downed airman from deep in North Vietnam.". Stovall was also recognized with the 1973 Jabara Award for Airmanship, two Silver Star awards and two Distinguished Flying Cross awards for other combat rescues among the 12 successful rescue missions he accomplished during his tour in Southeast Asia. Stovall retired from the Air Force as a brigadier general on June 1, 1993.

Background

Stovall was born in Toppenish, Washington, and enlisted with the US Air Force in June 1962. The following year, he was accepted to the U.S. Air Force Academy at Colorado Springs, Colorado, and graduated with the class of 1967.

Rescue of Roger Locher

During the initial phase of Operation Linebacker in May 1972, an American  F-4D was shot down by a North Vietnamese Shenyang J-6. Pilot Maj. Robert Lodge refused to eject, but his weapons officer Roger Locher was able to get out of the aircraft. Locher landed, unseen by either friendly or enemy forces, only  from  Hanoi, North Vietnam.

On June 1, 1972, his 22nd day behind enemy lines, he was finally able to contact a flight of American jets overhead, calling, "Any U.S. aircraft, if you read Oyster 1 Bravo, come up on Guard". Lt. James Dunn and others, including Capt. Steve Ritchie in one of the F-4 aircraft overhead, heard his radio call and remembered Locher's call sign. When the aircraft answered, Locher calmly responded, "Guys I've been down here a long time, any chance of picking me up?"  His transmissions left some Americans who did not hear his call in doubt about the authenticity of his message, and they believed that the NVA may have manipulated a POW into impersonating him, setting a trap for the would-be rescuers.

Rescue operation

Capt. Stovall, based at Nakhon Phanom Royal Thai Navy Base in Thailand responded, piloting a HH-53 from the 40th Aerospace Rescue and Recovery Squadron along with a rescue force consisting of several A-1Hs and another HH-53. As they neared Locher's position, the A-1 Skyraiders and HH-53C helicopters came under attack from two MiGs, several surface-to-air missiles and gunfire. The rescue force eluded one MiG in a narrow canyon, but were eventually driven back by the enemy fire and failed to get through to Locher on June 1.

On June 2, 1972, General John Vogt, commander of the 7th Air Force canceled the entire strike mission set for Hanoi on that day. He sent a task force of 119 aircraft including Stovall piloting his HH-53 rescue helicopter, bombers, and an array of F-4 escorts, EB-66s, A-1Hs, F105G Weasels, and KC135 tankers to get Locher out. "We shut down the war to go get Roger Locher," Stovall later said.

Capt. Ronald E. Smith in an A-1H guided Capt. Stovall to Locher's position. Only when Locher rose out of the jungle canopy riding the jungle penetrator were all of the Americans sure it was him. Despite their proximity to Yên Bái Air Base, no aircraft were lost during Locher's rescue. At only 60 miles (97 km) from Hanoi, it was the deepest rescue inside North Vietnam during the Vietnam War.

Awards and decorations

Silver Star

Capt Stovall was recognized on several occasions for his bravery during the Vietnam War. He received the Silver Star for actions on March 2, 1972. The citation reads in part:

 
Three months later, on June 27, 1972, he was instrumental in recovering another air man for which he was awarded the Silver Star with Bronze Oak Leaf Cluster:

Air Force Cross

For his flights on two days deep inside North Vietnam on June 1 and 2, 1972, to rescue Maj. Lochar, Stovall received the Air Force Cross on November 22, 1972:

Distinguished Flying Cross

On April 13, 1972, Stovall assisted in rescuing a Marine Corps pilot for which he received the Distinguished Flying Cross. The citation reads in part:

Stovall was recognized again six months later on December 6, 1972, and received the Distinguished Flying Cross with Bronze Oak Leaf Cluster.

Peacetime awards

During peacetime he was recognized with the Defense Superior Service Medal, the Legion of Merit with one Bronze Oak Leaf Cluster, the Meritorious Service Medal with one Bronze Oak Leaf cluster and the Air Force Commendation Medal.

References

Further reading
 Brigadier General Dale E. Stovall

1944 births
Living people
United States Air Force generals
United States Air Force personnel of the Vietnam War
Recipients of the Legion of Merit
Recipients of the Silver Star
Recipients of the Distinguished Flying Cross (United States)
Recipients of the Air Force Cross (United States)
Recipients of the Defense Superior Service Medal
People from Toppenish, Washington
United States Air Force Academy alumni
Recipients of the Jabara Award